Oenobotys pantoppidani is a moth in the family Crambidae. It was described by W. von Hedemann in 1894. It is found on the Virgin Islands.

References

Moths described in 1894
Pyraustinae